Pengiran Nurrul Aleshahnezan bin Pengiran Metali (born 21 January 1989) is a Bruneian footballer who plays as a midfielder or defender for Almerez FA of the Brunei-Muara District Football League. He appeared twice for the Brunei national football team in 2008.

Club career
Aleshahnezan first played league football for NBT FC in the Brunei Premier League from 2007 to 2010. Afterwards he moved to Majra FC after the conclusion of the 2011 Southeast Asian Games. He switched clubs to Indera SC for the 2014 Brunei Super League season, and stayed there for three years, winning the championship in his first year.

International career
Aleshahnezan played for Brunei under-16s at the 2005 Lion City Cup, then the 2005 AFF U-20 Youth Championship held in Singapore and Indonesia respectively. He then played three games for the under-21s at the 2007 Hassanal Bolkiah Trophy. He made his international debut for the national team at the 2008 AFC Challenge Cup qualification matches held in the Philippines. He played twice in that tournament, against the home side and also Bhutan.

Three years later, Aleshahnezan travelled with the national under-23 team to Indonesia for the 26th SEA Games, at a time when Brunei was just recovering from a two-year exile from international football. He started in the only victory for the Young Wasps, a 2-1 win over the Philippines.

Honours
Indera SC
Brunei Super League: 2014
Piala Sumbangsih: 2015

Personal life
Aleshahnezan's brothers are also footballers. Elder brother Aleshahfezan is formerly a player for Jerudong FC, while younger brothers Jumatatul Aleshahrezan and Iddzaham Aleshahmezan have represented Brunei youth teams.

References

External links

1989 births
Living people
Association football defenders
Bruneian footballers
Brunei international footballers
Indera SC players
Competitors at the 2011 Southeast Asian Games
Southeast Asian Games competitors for Brunei